Botha's lark (Spizocorys fringillaris) is a species of lark in the family Alaudidae.

It is endemic to South Africa. Its natural habitats are subtropical or tropical high-altitude grassland and pastureland. It is threatened by habitat loss.

Taxonomy and systematics
Botha's lark was originally placed in the genus Alauda. Formerly, some authorities have classified it within either the genus Calandrella or the monotypic genus Botha. An alternate species name of difficilis has also been used to describe Botha's lark.

Behaviour and ecology

Food and feeding
The diet of Botha's lark includes seeds and insects, including beetles and moths.

References

External links

 Species text - The Atlas of Southern African Birds

Spizocorys
Endemic birds of South Africa
Botha's lark
Taxonomy articles created by Polbot